Geoffrey Blancaneaux was the defending champion, but chose to participate in men's singles qualifying instead and lost to Maxime Janvier in the first round.

Alexei Popyrin won the title, defeating Nicola Kuhn in the final, 7–6(7–5), 6–3.

Seeds

Draw

Finals

Top half

Section 1

Section 2

Bottom half

Section 3

Section 4

Qualifying

Seeds

Qualifiers

Draw

First qualifier

Second qualifier

Third qualifier

Fourth qualifier

Fifth qualifier

Sixth qualifier

Seventh qualifier

Eighth qualifier

External links 
 Draw

Boys' Singles
2017